Sashi Kumar (born 17 February 1982) is an Indian cricketer. He made his first-class debut for Puducherry in the 2018–19 Ranji Trophy on 20 November 2018.

References

External links
 

1982 births
Living people
Indian cricketers
Pondicherry cricketers
Place of birth missing (living people)